

Plants

Angiosperms

Molluscs

Newly described bivalves

Arthropods

Newly described arachnids

Newly described crustaceans

Newly described insects

Vertebrates
 Stokes suggested that sauropods recycled their gastroliths and chose them based on brightness of color.

Newly described dinosaurs

Newly named birds

Pterosaurs

New taxa

References

 
Paleontology
Paleontology 7